Megisto cymela, the little wood satyr, is a butterfly species of the Satyrinae family that occurs in North America.

Description

Adult
The wingspan is 29–48 mm. The forewing has two yellow-rimmed black eyespots on both sides, dorsal and ventral. The hindwing has two spots on the dorsal side but have smaller spots on the ventral. The other all color is light brown. The wood satyr is comparably larger than sosybia.
Caterpillar
The body is light greenish brown with a dark dorsal line and alternating brown and yellowish lateral stripes. The surface of the caterpillar has bumps, these bumps bear short reddish-brown hairs. The head is dirty white while the tail hairs are light gray.

The wood satyr is part of the typically Neotropical subtribe Euptychiina.  It can be observed in forests, usually along the edges and in brush-filled openings along cleared forest roads. It has also been observed in grassy areas usually between forested patches.  It flies near the ground, twisting between and through grasses, small trees and bushes.  Collectors have found it often difficult to capture, though it appears to be a slow flyer at first glance. This butterfly prefers habitat that is open, contains deciduous trees along with marshy areas and possessing brushy cover.

Range and habitat
They are seen in the eastern United States and southeastern Canada, from Nova Scotia south into Florida, west to Texas, Saskatchewan and Wyoming. As the name implies the little wood satyr is most commonly seen in woods and shrubby areas.

Life cycle
Adults in the northern portions of their range fly between June and July while their southern populations fly between March and September. Adults have a slow "bouncing" flight but they will rise as far as the top of tall trees. Females lay eggs singly on grass, the fourth-instar caterpillars hibernate.

Larval foods
 Dactylis glomerata
 Poa pratensis
 Eremochloa ophiuroides

Adult foods
 Plant sap
 Aphid honeydew
 Rarely nectar

References

Bibliography 

"Megisto Hübner, [1819]" at Markku Savela's Lepidoptera and Some Other Life Forms

External links
Little Wood-Satyr, Butterflies of Canada

Butterflies of North America
Euptychiina
Butterflies described in 1777
Taxa named by Pieter Cramer